Nikiforos Vrettakos (Krokees, 1 January 1912 – Athens, 4 August 1991) was a Greek writer and poet.

Biography
Nikephoros Vrettakos was born in the village of Krokees (Κροκεές), near Sparta, Laconia but originated from Mani. He published his first collection of poems, Under Shadows and Lights, in 1929, at the age of seventeen.  That same year he moved to Athens to attend university, but left after a year to take a series of jobs as a clerk in various businesses.  In 1937 he began a thirty-year career in the Greek Civil Service, also seeing combat service in the Greco-Italian War during this period. In 1967 he responded to the takeover of Greece by a military dictatorship by going into self-imposed exile in Switzerland and Italy, where he remained until returning to Greece in 1974. He also wrote a poem about Kostas Georgakis, the student who set himself ablaze in Genoa as a protest against the junta.

Nikephoros Vrettakos was considered one of Greece's most important poets. He won a number of prizes and medals, including the Greek State Poetry Prize twice. Some of his poems became popular songs in musical settings by Greek composers, including Mikis Theodorakis. His verse was also translated into many languages. He was also elected as a member of the Academy of Athens in 1987.

Vrettakos died in Athens.

Works
Greek text:
Τά ποιήματα (ed. Tria Phylla, Athens, 1991), 3 vols

Works by or about, in English:
The Charioteer:  An Annual Review of Modern Greek Culture. Numbers 33/34 1991-1992 (Pella Publishing Company, Inc.) — Book length special issue of articles about and English translations of Vrettakos's poems
"Nikiforos Vrettakos - Selected Poems", translated by David Connolly, Aiora Press, Athens 2015

Anthologies in English including some of Vrettakos's poems:
Bien, P. et al. A Century of Greek Poetry:  Bilingual Edition. (Cosmos Publishing, Vale, N.J. 2004)
Friar, Kimon. Modern Greek Poetry (Efstathiadis, Athens, 1993)
Raizis, M. Byron. Greek Poetry Translations (Efstathiadis, Athens, 1983)

Notes

1912 births
1991 deaths
Greek male poets
Generation of the '30s
Greek Resistance members
Members of the Academy of Athens (modern)
20th-century Greek poets
20th-century Greek male writers

Maniots
People from Laconia
Greek military personnel of World War II